The common agama, red-headed rock agama or rainbow agama (Agama agama) is a species of lizard from the family Agamidae found in most of sub-Saharan Africa. To clear up historical confusion based on Linnaeus and other authors, Wagner, et al. (2009)  designated a neotype (ZFMK 15222) for the species, using a previously described specimen from Cameroon in the collection of the Zoologisches Forschungsmuseum Alexander Koenig in Bonn. The species name was formerly applied to a paraphyletic collection of taxa, and mitochondrial DNA analysis of various populations indicates they represent separate species., Consequently, three former subspecies A. a. africana, A. a. boensis, and A. a. mucosoensis are now considered separate species, and A. a. savattieri is considered synonymous with A. africana.

Description 
Males are typically  longer than the average female. The agama lizard can be identified by having a white underside, brown back limbs and a tail with a light stripe down the middle. The stripe on the tail typically possesses about six to seven dark patches along its side. Females, adolescents and subordinate males have an olive green head, while a dominant male has a blue body and yellow tail.

Distribution and habitat 
The common agama can be found native in countries such as Benin, Burkina Faso, Uganda, Cameroon, Cape Verde, Chad, Gabon, Ghana, Guinea, Guinea-Bissau, Kenya, Liberia, Mali, Mauritania, Nigeria, Senegal, Togo, Tanzania, India and Madagascar.,. However, it has been introduced through the reptile trade to southern Florida, where it has become extremely common. Agama agama is well-suited to arid conditions. These lizards remain active throughout the day except for the hottest hour, when even shady spots can reach .

Diet 
Common agamas are primarily insectivores, but they have been known to eat small mammals, reptiles and vegetation such as flowers, grasses, and fruits. Their diet consists of mainly ants, grasshoppers, beetles and termites. They catch their prey using their tongue, the tip of which is covered by mucous glands that enable the lizard to hold to smaller prey.

Behaviour 
Male agamas are territorial and must fight other males to claim their space. Agamas live in social groups including a lead male, about half a dozen females, and subordinate males. Subordinate males can only gain their own group if they eliminate the existing lead male (the "cock") or establish a colony outside all other cocks' territory. Only the cock is allowed to mate with the females. The center of a cock's territory is usually marked by the presence of a physical object, such as a tree or boulder, on which the lizards congregate. In urban areas, fights between males are more common because space is at a higher premium.

Reproduction 
Females are sexually matured at 14–18 months, while males take 2 years. Agama agama tends to reproduce during the wet season, but can also reproduce in areas that receive constant rainfall. Once finished, the female will lay a clutch of 5–7 ellipsoidal eggs that hatch within a period of 8–10 weeks.

Common agama has thermoregulated embryos, so all male eggs will have a temperature of  while female eggs will be in the range . After hatching, the offspring will measure about  snout to vent, plus their  tail.

References

Further reading 
 Spawls, S., et al. (2006). Reptiles and Amphibians of East Africa Princeton: Princeton University Press.

External links 
 
 
 
 

agama
Fauna of Rivers State
Agamid lizards of Africa
Reptiles described in 1758
Taxa named by Carl Linnaeus